The Director of Public Transport (also referred to as the Director, or the DPT) was the head of the Public Transport Division (PTD) of the Victorian Department of Transport. PTD was the government agency responsible for promoting, providing, coordinating and regulating public transport in the state of Victoria, Australia between August 1999 and June 2013. The Director of Public Transport was created as a statutory office supported by staff of the Department of Transport.

The key responsibilities of the Director centred on the entering into and management of franchising contracts with train, tram and bus companies to provide public transport services in Melbourne and Victoria. The Director also had oversight of the Victorian Taxi Directorate which regulates the taxi and hire car industry in Victoria. As part of its operational functions, the DPT also had responsibilities relating to public transport planning and projects as well as the accreditation of passenger transport companies for enforcement purposes and the appointment and management of authorised officers for enforcement activities across Victoria's public transport system.

On 2 April 2012, the majority of the Director's functions were transferred to either the newly created Public Transport Victoria or the Secretary of the Department of Transport. The office of the Director of Public Transport was abolished on 30 June 2013.

Main responsibilities

Trains, trams and buses 

The most prominent responsibilities of the Director of Public Transport concerned the franchising or contracting of transport operators to provide train, tram and bus services in Melbourne and regional Victoria.  Accordingly, the Director was responsible for procuring services through operators, and entering into and managing franchise contracts. The key contracts managed by the office were:

Trains in Melbourne (contract with Metro Trains Melbourne)- these services covered the provision of suburban rail services in Melbourne
Trams in Melbourne (with Keolis Downer) - these services covered the provision of suburban tram services in Melbourne
 Trains in regional Victoria (with V/Line) - these services covered the provision of train services in country and regional Victoria
 Bus services in Melbourne and the rest of Victoria, including school bus services, with a large number of different bus operators.

Train and tram services in Victoria are governed by complex statutory, government and commercial relationships. VicTrack is the custodian of all rail infrastructure and assets in Victoria. VicTrack leased these to the Director of Public Transport through the Metropolitan Infrastructure Head Lease. The Director then sub-leased the assets to the train and tram operators through Infrastructure Leases. The Director managed the rights and obligations contained in these leases on behalf of the State. The Director also entered into franchise agreements with the metropolitan train and tram operators that governed the provision of public transport passenger services. The franchise agreements specified a range of operational and service requirements administered and managed by the Director.

In relation to regional train services operated by V/Line, similar arrangements were entered into with VicTrack and the Director. VicTrack leased the regional train infrastructure and assets to the Director, who then sub-leased these assets to V/Line under the Regional Infrastructure Lease. Similarly, the Director and V/Line entered into a franchise agreement which governed the operational and service requirements for regional train services.

Taxis and hire cars 

The Director of Public Transport was the regulator of taxi and hire car services in Victoria. The Victorian Taxi Directorate (VTD) was a specialised Branch of the DPT and managed these services under delegation from the Director.  The office of the Director, again through the VTD, was also responsible for the accreditation of commercial passenger vehicle drivers including taxi drivers. The responsibilities were later conferred by delegation on the VTD from the Secretary of the Department of Transport but have been overseen by the Taxi Services Commission as of 1 July 2013.

Other responsibilities 
The Director was also charged with the accreditation of passenger transport companies for enforcement purposes, and the appointment and management of authorised officers for enforcement across the public transport system. The Director also had responsibility for regulating the appointment and activities of driving instructors and administering a compensation scheme for traumatised train drivers. The responsibilities were later conferred by delegation on the VTD from the Secretary of the Department of Transport but since 1 July 2013 are the responsibility of the Taxi Services Commission.

Governance

Establishment 

The office of the Director of Public Transport was established in 1999 following the passage of the Rail Corporations (Further Amendment) Act 1998 through the Victorian Parliament. This Act effectively privatised those aspects of the operation of public transport in Victoria which were not already provided directly by private companies. On 24 August 1999, the Director effectively took over responsibility for public transport in Victoria from the former Public Transport Corporation, which had been a statutory authority responsible for operating a large proportion of Victoria's public transport services.

The Rail Corporations (Further Amendment) Act inserted provisions into the then Transport Act 1983 to create the office and its functions and powers.  The office of the DPT was later re-established under the Transport Integration Act 2010.

Transport Integration Act 

The Transport Integration Act provided the Director of Public Transport with new objects, functions and powers on 1 July 2010.

Objects 
The Transport Integration Act provided that the primary object of the Director of Public Transport was to "...provide, operate and maintain the public transport system...". Other notable objects of the Director included:

 ensuring, in collaboration with other transport bodies and public entities, that public transport operates as part of an integrated transport system which seeks to meet the needs of all transport system users
 managing public transport in a manner which supports sustainability by seeking to increase the share of public transport trips as a proportion of all transport trips in Victoria
 seeking to improve the environmental performance of public transport including by minimising its adverse environmental impacts
 contributing to social well-being by providing access to opportunities and supporting liveable communities
 promoting economic prosperity through efficient and reliable movement of public transport users while also supporting rail freight services
 improving the safety of public transport for public transport users.

Functions 

The functions of the Director of Public Transport included:

 constructing, maintaining or varying public transport infrastructure
 planning for the public transport system
 providing, operating or facilitating public transport including by entering or managing contracts for public transport services and purchasing and maintaining rolling stock
 developing policies and strategies to improve safety and security on the public transport system
 developing and implementing policies, plans and guidelines
 providing licensing and accreditation services
 monitoring and reporting on contractual performance.

Powers 
The general and specific powers of the Director of Public Transport included a broad range of powers in relation to land, contracting, rolling stock, tree clearance, breaking up roads, installing stopping places, closure of level crossings, stopping of traffic, etc.

Other Victorian transport agencies 

There are a range of State agencies responsible for the transport system in Victoria.  The Department of Transport (DOT) oversees and coordinates the activities of the agencies which can be divided into three main types - statutory offices, statutory authorities and independent transport safety agencies. Together with DOT, the agencies provide, manage and regulate transport system activities in Victoria including:
 heavy and light rail systems including trains and trams
 roads systems and vehicles including cars, trucks and bicycles
 ports and waterways including commercial ships and recreational vessels
 some air transport systems.

Statutory office 
The statutory office is the Transport Infrastructure Development Agent

Statutory authorities 
The statutory authorities are:
 the VicRoads
 Public Transport Victoria
 VicTrack
 V/Line
 Taxi Services Commission
 the Linking Melbourne Authority
 the Port of Melbourne Corporation
 the Port of Hastings Development Authority
 the Victorian Regional Channels Authority
 the Transport Ticketing Authority
 the Regional Rail Link Authority.

Many of these agencies are more or less separate from the Department of Transport.

Independent transport safety agencies 

The independent transport safety agencies are:
 the Director, Transport Safety (Transport Safety Victoria)
 the Chief Investigator, Transport Safety.

These agencies are part of the Department of Transport but are functionally independent and report to the relevant Ministers.

Abolition of the Director of Public Transport 
 
The office of Director of Public Transport was phased out by the state government following the Victorian state election in November 2010. The Transport Legislation Amendment (Taxi Services Reform and Other Matters) Act 2011 transferred direct responsibility for taxi and small commercial passenger vehicle services from the Director to the Secretary of the Department of Transport. That was essentially a transitional step before the activities were assumed by the Taxi Services Commission established by that Act. The Commission took over regulatory control of taxis and hire cars on 1 July 2013. More broadly, the Director's responsibility for the provision of train, tram and bus services across Victoria were transferred to Public Transport Victoria on 2 April 2012. The office of the Director of Public Transport was finally abolished on 1 July 2013.

See also 

 Rail Transport in Victoria
 Railways in Melbourne
 Trams in Melbourne
 Buses in Melbourne
 Transport Integration Act
 Director, Transport Safety
 Chief Investigator, Transport Safety
 Public Transport Victoria
 Taxi Industry Inquiry
 Taxi Services Commission
 Transport Act 1983
 Transport (Compliance and Miscellaneous) Act 1983
 Transport Legislation Amendment (Taxi Services Reform and Other Matters) Act 2011

References

External links 
 Department of Transport website
 Government of Victoria website

Public transport in Melbourne
Former government agencies of Victoria (Australia)
Government agencies established in 1999
1999 establishments in Australia
2013 disestablishments in Australia